Perth Orioles were an Australian netball team that, between 1997 and 2007, represented Netball Western Australia in the Commonwealth Bank Trophy. Orioles were one of the founding teams of the competition. They never finished higher than sixth in the competition's eleven seasons and finished last four times. In 2008, when the Commonwealth Bank Trophy was replaced by the ANZ Championship, Perth Orioles were rebranded as West Coast Fever.

History

Commonwealth Bank Trophy
Between 1997 and 2007, Perth Orioles played in the Commonwealth Bank Trophy league.
Together with Adelaide Ravens, Adelaide Thunderbirds, Melbourne Kestrels, Melbourne Phoenix, Sydney Swifts, Queensland Firebirds and Sydney Sandpipers, Orioles were one of the founding members of the league. 

Regular season statistics

Home venues
During the 2004 and 2005 seasons Perth Orioles played home games at the Challenge Stadium.

Notable former players

Internationals

 Caitlin Bassett
 Kate Beveridge
 Catherine Cox  
 Susan Fuhrmann
 Jessica Shynn

 Larrissa Willcox

West Coast Fever

Captains

Player of the Year

Most appearances

Magnificent Seven
At the end of the 2007 season, former Perth Orioles coaches selected the best seven players that played for the team in the Commonwealth Bank Trophy era.

Head coaches

Sponsorship

References

 
West Coast Fever
Commonwealth Bank Trophy teams
Netball teams in Western Australia
Sporting clubs in Perth, Western Australia
Sports clubs established in 1997
1997 establishments in Australia